Year 1103 (MCIII) was a common year starting on Thursday (link will display the full calendar) of the Julian calendar.

Events 
 By place 

 Levant 
 Spring – Bohemond I, Norman prince of Antioch, is released from Seljuk imprisonment at Niksar, after a ransom is paid of 100,000 gold pieces. During his absence, Tancred (Bohemond's nephew) attacks the Byzantines, and re-captures the cities of Tarsus, Adana and Mamistra in Cilicia. Tancred is deprived of his lordship by Bohemond's return, and is rewarded with a small fief within the Principality of Antioch.
 The Crusaders under Raymond IV (Saint-Gilles) invade the Beqaa Valley and capture Tortosa to isolate Tripoli. Raymond expands towards the Orontes River, and begins to build a castle on the Mons Peregrinus ("Pilgrim's Mountain") which helps in the Siege of Tripoli (see 1102). Emperor Alexios I (Komnenos) supports the Crusaders by sending a Byzantine fleet (ten ships) to blockade the port of Tripoli.
 Summer – The Crusaders led by Bohemond I and Joscelin of Courtenay raid the territory of Aleppo to gain supplies. They capture the town of Muslimiyah, and extract a large tribute. Sultan Fakhr al-Mulk Radwan, the Seljuk ruler of Aleppo, agrees to pay 7,000 gold pieces and ten horses to the Crusaders while Bohemond agrees to release all Seljuk prisoners captured at Muslimiyah.

 Europe 
 August 24 – King Magnus III (Barefoot) is killed in battle with the Ulaid in Ulster. Sigurd Jorsalfare, Øystein Magnusson and Olaf Magnusson succeed him as joint kings of Norway.

 England 
 April 27 – Anselm, archbishop of Canterbury, again goes into exile after a dispute with King Henry I over the appointment of bishops and abbots to important Church positions.
 August 5 – Queen Matilda of Scotland, wife of Henry I, gives birth to their first son William Adelin at Winchester. They already have a daughter, Princess Matilda (or Maude).

 China 
 Li Jie, Chinese government minister, publishes his Yingzao Fashi technical treatise on Chinese architecture, during the reign of Emperor Hui Zong of the Song Dynasty.

 By topic 

 Religion 
 The Scandinavian city of Lund in the Swedish province of Scania becomes a see of the Catholic Church, namely the Archdiocese of Lund (approximate date).

Births 
 February 24 – Toba, emperor of Japan (d. 1156)
 March 24 – Yue Fei, Chinese general and poet (d. 1142)
 August 5 – William Adelin, duke of Normandy (d. 1120)
 Adeliza of Louvain (or Adelicia), queen of England (d. 1151)
 Aénor de Châtellerault, duchess of Aquitaine (d. 1130)
 Alfonso I, count of Tripoli and Toulouse (d. 1148)
 Heilika of Lengenfeld, German countess (d. 1170)
 Henry II, margrave of the Saxon Ostmark (d. 1123)
 Rögnvald Kali Kolsson, Norwegian earl (d. 1158)
 Vsevolod of Pskov, Kievan prince (approximate date)
 Wivina, French Benedictine abbess (d. 1168)

Deaths 
 January 17 – Frutolf of Michelsberg, German monk
 March 18 – Sybilla of Conversano, Norman duchess  
 July 10 – Eric I (the Good), king of Denmark
 August 24 – Magnus III (Barefoot), king of Norway (b. 1073)
 October 19 – Humbert II (the Fat), count of Savoy (b. 1065) 
 Al-Hakim al-Munajjim, Persian Nizari missionary
 Boedil Thurgotsdatter (or Bodil), Danish queen
 Ebles II, French nobleman (House of Montdidier)
 Henry I (the Elder), German nobleman (House of Wettin)
 Isaac Alfasi, Algerian Talmudist and posek (b. 1013)
 Manegold of Lautenbach, German priest (b. 1030)
 Osbern FitzOsbern, bishop of Exeter (b. 1032) 
 Sibylla of Burgundy, duchess of Burgundy (b. 1065)
 William Firmatus, Norman hermit and pilgrim (b. 1026)

References